Winsted is a city in McLeod County, Minnesota, United States. The population was 2,355 at the 2010 census.

History
A post office called Winsted has been in operation since 1858. The city was named after Winsted, Connecticut. The name "Winsted" is a portmanteau created from the names of two towns, Winchester and Barkhamsted, located in Litchfield County, Connecticut. The Electric Short Line (commonly referred to as the Luce Line) provided freight and interurban passenger rail service to Winsted. Passenger service ended by the 1950s, and the tracks were abandoned by the Chicago & North Western Railway in 1972.

Geography
McLeod County Roads 1, 5, 6, and 9 are the main routes in the community.

Demographics

2010 census

As of the census of 2010, there were 2,355 people, 947 households, and 596 families residing in the city. The racial makeup of the city was 97.5% White, 0.5% African American, 0.3% Native American, 0.1% Asian, 0.1% Pacific Islander, 0.9% from other races, and 0.6% from two or more races. Hispanic or Latino of any race were 1.8% of the population.

There were 947 households, of which 33.4% had children under the age of 18 living with them, 46.9% were married couples living together, 9.9% had a female householder with no husband present, 6.1% had a male householder with no wife present, and 37.1% were non-families. 30.4% of all households were made up of individuals, and 11.6% had someone living alone who was 65 years of age or older. The average household size was 2.41 and the average family size was 3.03.

The median age in the city was 36.3 years. 26.1% of residents were under the age of 18; 7.2% were between the ages of 18 and 24; 27.9% were from 25 to 44; 23.6% were from 45 to 64; and 15.2% were 65 years of age or older. The gender makeup of the city was 49.3% male and 50.7% female.

Compared with the 2000 census, the 2010 census showed an increase of 261 individuals, and a .92% increase in diversity.

Culture
Winsted has both a winter and summer town festival. The Winsted Winter Festival features a lighted parade as well as various other activities. The Winsted Summer Festival features a parade, street dance, a sand volleyball tournament, the crowning of Miss Winsted, and various other activities. Winsted is also home to Winstock Country Music Festival. The proceeds from the music festival support the Holy Trinity Catholic school system.

Government and politics
 Mayor: George Schulenberg
 Council: Mike Henrich, Tom Ollig, Bonnie Quast, and Steve Stotko 
 Administrator: Adam Birkholz
 Clerk Treasurer: Raquel Kirchoff
 Police Chief: Justin Heldt
 Fire chief: Jon Davidson
 Maintenance Supervisor: Chris Bahr
 City Attorney: Francis Eggert / Brian Gillis

Education
There are two school systems in Winsted. The Howard Lake–Waverly–Winsted school district  is the public school system which operates Winsted Elementary. The Catholic school system is made up of Holy Trinity High School, Holy Trinity Elementary School, and Tiny Trojans pre-school.

The Winsted Public Library is part of the Pioneerland Library System.

See also

Glencoe, Minnesota
McLeod County, Minnesota

References

External links
City Website

Cities in McLeod County, Minnesota
Cities in Minnesota